Mette Laugesen Graversgaard (born 5 October 1995) is a Danish athlete who specialises in the 60 metres hurdles and 100 metres hurdles.

She competed in the women's 4 × 100 metres relay at the 2019 World Athletics Championships, and in the 100 metres hurdles at the 2022 World Athletics Championships held in Eugene, Oregon.

Graversgaard is the Danish national record holder for the 50 m hurdles (7.28 seconds, Aarhus 2015), 60 m hurdles (7.92 seconds, Istanbul 2023) and 100 m hurdles with a time of 12.84 seconds (+0.9 m/s wind, Aalborg 2022).

References

External links
 

1995 births
Living people
Danish female sprinters
Place of birth missing (living people)
World Athletics Championships athletes for Denmark
European Games competitors for Denmark
Athletes (track and field) at the 2019 European Games